Sohra in Iran may refer to:
Sohra Ghazanfariyeh Shomali
Sohra Heydarabad
Sohra Khal-e Sefid
Sohra Kheyrabad
Sohra Morad Chaqvari

See also
Sohray (disambiguation), various places in Iran